The Judge John E. Cooper House, at 709 N. Main St. in West Liberty, Kentucky, was built in 1872.  It was listed on the National Register of Historic Places in 1996.

It is a two-story central passage plan I-house.

References

I-houses in Kentucky
National Register of Historic Places in Morgan County, Kentucky
Houses completed in 1872
Houses on the National Register of Historic Places in Kentucky
1872 establishments in Kentucky
Central-passage houses
West Liberty, Kentucky